Malignon is a settlement in Guadeloupe, on the island of Grande-Terre.  Quatre Chemins and Boisripeau are to the west; Jabrun is to the east.

Populated places in Guadeloupe